A Sharp Intake of Breath is a British sitcom starring David Jason, Jacqueline Clarke with Richard Wilson and Alun Armstrong for series 1-3, which ran from 1977 to 1981, when Jason took up the role of Del Trotter in Only Fools & Horses. It was made for the ITV network by ATV and recorded at ATV Elstree Studios. The opening titles featured cartoons by Mel Calman. Series 1-3 were written by Ronnie Taylor, series 4 by Vince Powell following the death of Taylor in 1979.

Plot
Jason played an everyman character called Peter Barnes and Jacqueline Clarke played his wife Sheila. Wilson and Armstrong played a range of petty officials and bureaucrats whose actions frustrated Barnes' attempts to deal with the necessities of everyday life. The title A Sharp Intake of Breath refers to the reactions of various characters to seemingly simple requests by Peter, generally followed by a denial. The show made use of the fourth wall plot device.

Cast
 David Jason as Peter Barnes
 Jacqueline Clarke as Sheila Barnes
 Richard Wilson as various characters
 Alun Armstrong as various characters
 Maggie Jones as Jean
 Malcolm Storry as Cyril Potts
 Bella Emberg as Doris
 Margaret Courtenay as Sheila's Mother
 Bunny May as Terry
 Gerald Flood, as the Doctor, in 'Rear Window' .

Episodes

Pilot (1977)

Series 1 (1978)

Series 2 (1979)

Series 3 (1980)

Series 4 (1981)

Home media
The Complete series was released on DVD .

External links

1970s British sitcoms
1977 British television series debuts
1980s British sitcoms
1981 British television series endings
English-language television shows
ITV sitcoms
Television shows produced by Associated Television (ATV)
Television series by ITV Studios
Television shows shot at ATV Elstree Studios